Get Into Something is an album by the Isley Brothers, released on their T-Neck imprint in 1970. Although the album itself did not chart, it includes six songs that appeared in the top 30 of the Billboard R&B chart between late 1969 and early 1971 (most of which dented the lower reaches of the Pop chart as well): the title track, "Bless Your Heart", the horn and drum-driven "Keep on Doin'" (which inspired the instrumental cover by The J.B.'s later that year under the title "The Grunt"), "Freedom", "Girls Will Be Girls" and "If He Can You Can".

The album's title track includes a James Brown-styled "give the drummer some" breakdown that was highly influential on the New York b-boy dance scene (later known as break dancing). The drum break, along with the LP's scarcity, has made this the most valuable and highly sought after Isley Brothers album among vinyl record collectors. It was remastered and expanded for inclusion in the 2015 released 23CD box set The RCA Victor & T-Neck Album Masters (1959-1983).

Critical reception
Newsday, reviewing a reissue, called the album "a raw raveup with a punchy horn section," writing that "the Isleys venture into James Brown territory with the stripped-down funk of 'Keep On Doin' '." Rolling Stone wrote that the album "balances fidgety, syncopated riffs (somebody should sample that title cut) with true-believer gospel harmonies."

Track listing

Ronald Isley sings lead on all tracks except:

Personnel
The Isley Brothers
 Ronald Isley – lead vocals and backing vocals
 O'Kelly Isley Jr. and Rudolph Isley – backing vocals and lead vocals
 Ernie Isley – bass guitar

with
 Charles "Skip" Pitts – guitars
 Truman Thomas – organ
 Everett Collins – keyboards
 George Moreland – drums
 George Patterson – arrangements
 Horns arranged by The Isley Brothers

References

1970 albums
Buddah Records albums
The Isley Brothers albums
T-Neck Records albums
Albums produced by Ronald Isley
Albums produced by Rudolph Isley